Club Social Cultural Deportivo Cristal Tumbes (sometimes referred as Cristal Tumbes) is a Peruvian football club, playing in the city of Tumbes, Peru.

History
The Club Social Cultural Deportivo Cristal Tumbes was founded on January 20, 1981.

In 2014 Copa Perú, the club classified to the National Stage, but was eliminated by La Bocana in the Semifinals.

In 2015 Copa Perú, the club classified to the National Stage, but was eliminated by Cantolao.

In 2016 Copa Perú, the club classified to the National Stage, but was eliminated when finished in 50th place.

Honours

Regional
Liga Departamental de Tumbes:
Winners (3): 2014, 2015, 2016

Liga Provincial de Tumbes:
Winners (1): 2014

Liga Superior de Tumbes:
Winners (1): 2015

Liga Distrital de Tumbes:
Winners (1): 2014

References

See also
List of football clubs in Peru
Peruvian football league system

Football clubs in Peru
Association football clubs established in 1981
1981 establishments in Peru